Erich Wichmann-Harbeck (born 27 October 1900, date of death unknown) was a Chilean sailor. He competed in the O-Jolle event at the 1936 Summer Olympics.

References

External links
 

1900 births
Year of death missing
Chilean male sailors (sport)
Olympic sailors of Chile
Sailors at the 1936 Summer Olympics – O-Jolle
Place of birth missing